Sandra Keans (born April 9, 1942) is an American politician in the state of New Hampshire. She is a former member of the New Hampshire House of Representatives, sitting as a Democrat from the Strafford 23 district from 2016 to her defeat in 2020. She previously served from 1980 to 2012.

References

Living people
1942 births
Democratic Party members of the New Hampshire House of Representatives
People from Rochester, New Hampshire
University of New Hampshire alumni
20th-century American women politicians
21st-century American women politicians
20th-century American politicians
21st-century American politicians